Jack S. Wink (August 3, 1922 – September 16, 1995) was an American football player and coach. He played college football at the University of Wisconsin–Madison (1942, 1946–1947) and University of Michigan (1943). He served in the United States Marine Corps during both World War II and the Korean War. He later served as a teacher and coach at Wayne State College, University of Wisconsin–Stout, and St. Cloud State University.

Early years
Wink was born in 1922 in Milwaukee, Wisconsin.  He was the son of Elmer and Jane (Florscyzk) Wink. His father was a city fireman. Wink attended Milwaukee Boys Tech High School.

Playing career
Wink attended the University of Wisconsin and played quarterback for the 1942 Wisconsin Badgers football team.  The following season, he played at the University of Michigan as a marine trainee.  Wink started two games as quarterback for the 1943 Michigan Wolverines.  After World War II, he returned to Wisconsin, lettering for the 1946 and 1947 Wisconsin football teams. As a senior in 1947, he was named the team's honorary captain at a postseason banquet.

Coaching and teaching career
Wink served in the United States Marine Corps during World War II from 1943 to 1946 before returning to Wisconsin to complete his master's degree. After graduating from Wisconsin, he served as the head football coach and a physical education teacher at New London High School in New London, Wisconsin during the 1948 season.

In July 1949, Wink was hired as head football coach by Wayne State Teachers College in Wayne, Nebraska. He served as the head football coach at Wayne State from 1949 to 1951, compiling a record of 21–6 with an undefeated 9–0 season and a conference championship in 1949.

In April 1952, Wink was hired as the head football coach at The Stout Institute, now known as the University of Wisconsin–Stout, in Menominee, Wisconsin. He held that position for four years and also coached the baseball team at Stout.

In May 1956, Wink was hired as head football coach by St. Cloud State Teachers College, now known as St. Cloud State University, in St. Cloud, Minnesota. He was the head football coach at St. Cloud for nine years from 1956 to 1964, compiling a  record of 25–45–5. Wink also coached the men's ice hockey team at St. Cloud State from 1956 to 1968, tallying a mark of 69–69–2. In April 1968, Wink resigned his coaching position at St. Cloud, though he continued to serve as director of intramural athletics.  He also continued until 1984 as an instructor in the department of health, physical education and recreation.

Family and later years
Wink was married to Virginia Warnecke in 1948. They had two daughters, Deborah and Wendy. He died in September 1995.

Head coaching record

College football

College ice hockey

References

External links
 

1922 births
1995 deaths
American football quarterbacks
Michigan Wolverines football players
St. Cloud State Huskies football coaches
St. Cloud State Huskies men's ice hockey coaches
Wayne State Wildcats football coaches
Wisconsin–Stout Blue Devils baseball coaches
Wisconsin–Stout Blue Devils football coaches
Wisconsin Badgers football players
High school football coaches in Wisconsin
Sportspeople from Milwaukee
Players of American football from Milwaukee
United States Marine Corps personnel of World War II
United States Marine Corps personnel of the Korean War